Major (later Brigadier General) Victor Herbert Strahm (26 October 1895 – 11 May 1957) began his career as a World War I flying ace credited with five aerial victories. In his 36-year career, he served as a chief test pilot for the United States Army Air Forces while en route to higher command.

During World War II, Strahm was Chief of Staff of the Ninth Air Force. He was promoted to deputy commander of the 33rd Air Division at Tinker Air Force Base in Oklahoma City and commander of Barksdale Air Force Base in Shreveport, Louisiana. He retired with the rank of Brigadier General in 1953 after 36 years of service. On 28 April 1957, having undergone heart surgery and despondent due to ill health, Strahm was found at his home in Shreveport with a bullet wound to the head and a .32 caliber pistol at his side. He was flown to the Lackland Air Force Base hospital and died on 11 May 1957 at the age of 61.

See also

 List of World War I flying aces from the United States

References

Bibliography
American Aces of World War 1 Harry Dempsey. Osprey Publishing, 2001. , .

1895 births
1957 suicides
Air Corps Tactical School alumni
Recipients of the Distinguished Service Cross (United States)
American World War I flying aces
United States Army Air Service pilots of World War I
People from Nashville, Tennessee
United States Air Force generals
United States Army Air Forces generals
Suicides by firearm in Texas
United States Army Air Forces generals of World War II